Elections to Strabane District Council were held on 18 May 1977 on the same day as the other Northern Irish local government elections. The election used three district electoral areas to elect a total of 15 councillors.

Election results

Note: "Votes" are the first preference votes.

Districts summary

|- class="unsortable" align="centre"
!rowspan=2 align="left"|Ward
! % 
!Cllrs
! % 
!Cllrs
! %
!Cllrs
! %
!Cllrs
!rowspan=2|TotalCllrs
|- class="unsortable" align="center"
!colspan=2 bgcolor="" | SDLP
!colspan=2 bgcolor="" | UUP
!colspan=2 bgcolor="" | DUP
!colspan=2 bgcolor="white"| Others
|-
|align="left"|Area A
|14.3
|1
|bgcolor="40BFF5"|35.9
|bgcolor="40BFF5"|2
|18.2
|1
|31.6
|1
|5
|-
|align="left"|Area B
|27.4
|1
|bgcolor="40BFF5"|34.8
|bgcolor="40BFF5"|2
|22.0
|1
|15.8
|1
|5
|-
|align="left"|Area C
|bgcolor="#99FF66"|50.9
|bgcolor="#99FF66"|3
|17.2
|1
|0.0
|0
|31.9
|1
|5
|-
|- class="unsortable" class="sortbottom" style="background:#C9C9C9"
|align="left"| Total
|30.5
|5
|29.5
|5
|13.6
|2
|26.4
|3
|15
|-
|}

Districts results

Area A

1973: 3 x UUP, 1 x SDLP, 1 x Independent Nationalist
1977: 2 x UUP, 1 x SDLP, 1 x DUP, 1 x Independent Nationalist
1973-1977 Change: DUP gain from UUP

Area B

1973: 2 x UUP, 1 x SDLP, 1 x Alliance, 1 x United Loyalist Coalition
1977: 2 x UUP, 1 x SDLP, 1 x DUP, 1 x Independent Nationalist
1973-1977 Change: Independent Nationalist gain from Alliance, United Loyalist Coalition joins DUP

Area C

1973: 2 x SDLP, 1 x UUP, 1 x Alliance, 1 x Independent Nationalist
1977: 3 x SDLP, 1 x UUP, 1 x Independent Nationalist
1973-1977 Change: SDLP gain from Alliance

References

Strabane District Council elections
Strabane